Black's Guides were travel guide books published by the Adam and Charles Black firm of Edinburgh (later London) beginning in 1839. The series' style tended towards the "colloquial, with fewer cultural pretensions" than its leading competitor Baedeker Guides. Contributors included David T. Ansted, Charles Bertram Black, and A.R. Hope Moncrieff.

List of Black's Guides by geographic coverage

Egypt

France

Great Britain

1830s-1850s
 
 
 
 
  + index

1860s-1870s
 
 
 
 
 
 
 
 
 . Index
 
  + Index

1880s-1890s
 
 
 
 
  + Index
 
 
 
  +

1900s-1910s

Ireland

Italy

Netherlands

Norway

Palestine

Switzerland

Turkey

References

Travel guide books
Series of books
Publications established in 1839
A & C Black books
Tourism in Europe